was a District located in Eastern Iyo Province (now Ehime Prefecture). Due to the 1878 Land Reforms, the district merged with Ochi District and the district dissolved.

See also 
 List of dissolved districts of Japan

Noma District
1878 disestablishments